Gesang der Parzen (Song of the Fates), Op. 89, is a piece for mixed choir and orchestra by Johannes Brahms.

The work uses a text from Goethe's Iphigenie auf Tauris (which had earlier been set for four voices by Johann Friedrich Reichardt). Written in one movement, the piece was composed in 1882, premiered in Basel on 10 December of the same year, and published in 1883.

It is written for six-part choir (altos and basses divided into two) and an orchestra comprising two flutes (one doubling piccolo), two oboes, two B clarinets, two bassoons, double bassoon, two French horns in D, two French horns in F, two trumpets, alto, tenor and bass trombones, tuba, timpani and strings.

The piece is not often performed but has been recorded several times, and has had its fans: Anton Webern admired a passage in the coda built on a cycle of major thirds.

References

External links
 Full score from the International Music Score Library Project
 German text and English translation from the LiederNet Archive
 Listening Guide by Kelly Dean Hansen

1882 compositions
Compositions by Johannes Brahms
Choral compositions